Romuald the Reindeer is a British children's animated series, created by Robin Lyons and Andrew Offiler, and produced by Siriol Productions and La Fabrique in association with EVA Entertainment. It aired on the BBC on 24 September 1996 and focuses on the adventures of a Christmas reindeer named Romuald, a character who had previously appeared in Siriol Productions and La Fabrique's thirty-minute specials Santa and the Tooth Fairies and Santa's First Christmas and an episode of their television series Tales of the Tooth Fairies. The series ran for a single season, consisting of thirteen ten-minute episodes.

Synopsis
The series takes place in Reindeersville, Lapland, a community of Christmas reindeer. The reindeer populace can all fly, and use their antlers like hands, playing instruments, picking up phones, etc. The focus is on Romuald Haroldson, a sullen teen reindeer, and his misadventures.

Characters
Romuald Haroldson is a teenage Christmas reindeer. Melancholy, woebegone, and always carrying around a sledful of teen angst, Romuald suffers life's twists and turns more than most, although things usually work out for him in the end. Romuald is voiced by Nigel Planer.
Ulrika Haroldson is Romuald's three-and-a-half year old little sister. She usually gets her own way at home, and loves to pester her big brother. Ulrika is voiced by Julie Higginson.
Harold and Hilda Haroldson are Romuald and Ulrika's parents. Harold is your average working Reindeer, whilst Hilda is knitting mad. Both are clueless towards their son's angst-ridden attitude, and powerless to say "no" to Ulrika's demands-usually. Harold is voiced by Jonathan Kydd and Hilda is voiced by Emma Wray.
Grandpa Ivy is a senior member of Santa's elves. He tends to the sheep around Lapland, and teaches classes at the reindeer school. Grandpa Ivy is voiced by Kenneth Waller.
Clint, Kirk and Burt are the local reindeer bullies, determined to make life miserable for everyone (particularly Romuald). All three wear leather jackets. Clint wears shades, Kirk wears a cap over his antlers, Burt has a permanent black eye and his antlers wear boxing gloves. Clint is voiced by Arthur Smith, Kirk is voiced by Jonathan Kydd and Burt is voiced by Christian Rodska.

Episodes
 Baby Sitter (24 September 1996)
 Deerwatch (1 October 1996)
 Flee on the Wall (8 October 1996)
 Migration World (15 October 1996)
 Knitted Patterns (22 October 1996)
 Reindeer School (29 October 1996)
 Ulrika's Solo Flight (5 November 1996)
 Camping Trip (12 November 1996)
 Space Reindeer (19 November 1996)
 Computer Whizz (3 December 1996)
 Pet Swap (10 December 1996)
 Pen Pals (17 December 1996)
 Music Maestro (20 December 1996)

Home release
A single video, entitled Adventures With Romuald the Reindeer was released, containing the episodes "Music Maestro", "Computer Whizz", "Space Reindeer", "Reindeer School" and "Baby Sitter".

External links
  Romuald the Reindeer on The Internet Movie Database

1990s British animated television series
1990s British children's television series
1996 British television series debuts
1996 British television series endings
British children's animated adventure television series